Golf Club Halt railway station may refer to the following former stations in the United Kingdom:

 Golf Club Halt railway station (Scotland), serving the Alyth Golf Club, in the Scottish county of Perth and Kinross
 Golf Club Halt railway station (England), in Hove, East Sussex

See also 
 Golf Street Halt railway station, in Carnoustie, Scotland
 Worlington Golf Links Halt railway station, a station former in Suffolk, England